Click Click Snap is a 2007 book by Sean McGowan.  It is a work of literary nonfiction and a photographic novel (but not a photo novel).

The book has been released into the public domain.  The full book can be read for free (see source).

Synopsis 
Click Click Snap is written in first person prose.  In the book, Sean McGowan travels through Athens, Ephesus, Bent Jbail, Beirut, Damascus, The West Bank, Petra, and Cairo; completing the eight chapters of the book, respectively.  Its diverse (and, arguably, scattered) topics mainly include the neuroscience of art, war, belief, racism.

Unusually, each chapter is written as a self-sustaining joke, where more serious topics seemingly arise incidentally.  Specific incidences include urinating on the Temple of Artemis to illustrate the benefits of biological satisfaction and stealing a federal election ballot at gunpoint during the 2007 elections in Syria to show "...even though there is such a thing as a ballot with only one name on it, there is no such thing as a clear choice."

References

External links 
 Official Homepage
 Click Click Snap Online & Searchable HTML Version
 Click Click Snap PDF version of the entire novel
 Sean McGowan's Homepage
 .

2007 books